BZ-1 may refer to:

Bowlus BZ-1, an American glider
BŻ-1 GIL, a Polish experimental helicopter
BZ1, a 1983 album by Bezobrazno Zeleno
An-12BZ-1, an Antonov An-12 variant aircraft

See also
BZ (disambiguation)
Belize dollar